France sent 15 athletes and two guides to the 2018 Winter Paralympics in Pyeongchang, South Korea. They competed in para-alpine skiing, para-Nordic skiing and para-snowboarding. Marie Bochet carried the flag during the Opening Ceremony. 

Four people from France competed in para-snowboarding. Five people competed in para-alpine skiing. Six skiers and two guide skiers competed in para-Nordic skiing. They won seven gold medals, eight silver and five bronze including four golds for Bochet and three golds and two silvers for Benjamin Daviet.

Medalists

Team
People from France went to the 2018 Winter Paralympics in para-alpine skiing, para-Nordic skiing and para-snowboarding.  People on the team were Benjamin Daviet and Cécile Hernandez.  Marie Bochet was chosen to carry the flag during the Opening Ceremony.  She was chosen 100 days before the 2018 Games started. The first people were included on the team in September 2017. The list included Thomas Clarion.

"Team France" was represented by the following athletes at the 2018 Games:

Para-alpine skiing
There were five skiers from France. They were Arthur Bauchet, Marie Bochet, Jordan Broisin, Frederic François and Yohann Taberlet.

Para-Nordic skiing
Benjamin Daviet was at the 2014 Winter Paralympics. He did not win a medal. His best finish was seventh. The first medal he won at a major competition was in 2017 at a race in Finsterau.

Thomas Dubois first represented France at racing at the 2017 World Cup in Ukraine. Before that, he was the French junior champion in biathlon and cross-country skiing.  He finished second in biathlon and cross-country skiing at the senior French championships.  Dubois became blind when he was an 8-year-old because of a genetic disorder.  He needs to ski with a guide skier.  Unlike other countries, Fédération française handisport does not give money to guide skiers to help blind skiers with the cost of competing. To get the right to go to and practice for the Winter Paralympics, it cost €21,000.   Dubois had to raise money to be able to pay for that.  Maubourguet Lions Club helped Dubois get the money for the Winter Paralympics.

Para-snowboarding
There were three snowboarders from France at the 2018 Winter Paralympics. Snowboarders from France went to Pyrénées at the last part of January 2018 to get ready for the 2018 Winter Paralympics. Cécile Hernandez was one of the snowboarders from France.  She went to the 2014 Winter Paralympics.  It was the first Paralympics for Montaggioni and Roulet. Hernandez and Roulet have arm disabilities. Montaggioni has a problem with her legs.  They were coached by Olivier Noiret and Marcos Lorenzo.

References

Nations at the 2018 Winter Paralympics
2018
Paralympics